The 2015 Grambling State Tigers football team represented Grambling State University in the 2015 NCAA Division I FCS football season. The Tigers were led by second-year head coach Broderick Fobbs. They competed as a member of the West Division of the Southwestern Athletic Conference (SWAC) and played their home games at Eddie Robinson Stadium in Grambling, Louisiana. They finished the season 9–3, 9–0 in SWAC play to be champions of the West Division. They represented the West Division in the SWAC Championship Game where they lost to Alcorn State.

Schedule

Schedule Source:

Ranking movements

References

Grambling State
Grambling State Tigers football seasons
Grambling State Tigers football